Charles Anthony Fried (born April 15, 1935) is an American jurist and lawyer.  He served as United States Solicitor General under President Ronald Reagan from 1985 to 1989. He is a professor at Harvard Law School and has been a visiting professor at Columbia Law School. He also serves on the board of the nonpartisan group, the Campaign Legal Center.

Fried is the author of nine books and over 30 journal articles, and his work has appeared in over a dozen collections.

Early life and education
Fried was born in 1935 in Prague, Czechoslovakia, where his father was an important industrialist and Czech patriot. The Frieds left Czechoslovakia in 1939 to escape Nazi Germany's persecution of Jews, lived in England for almost two years and came to the United States in 1941 via Montreal, Quebec, Canada. He and his parents became United States citizens in 1948, after the Communist takeover of Czechoslovakia. After graduating from the Lawrenceville School in 1952, he attended Princeton University, where he was a member of Phi Beta Kappa and received an A.B. in modern languages and literature in 1956 after completing a senior thesis titled "The Phedre of Racine: An Analysis of the Play's Artistry." Fried then attended the University of Oxford, where he earned a Bachelor of Arts and Master of Arts degree in jurisprudence, in 1958 and 1960, respectively, and was awarded the Ordronnaux Prize in Law (1958). In 1960, Fried received his Bachelor of Laws (LL.B.) degree from Columbia Law School, where he was a Stone Scholar. Subsequently, he served as law clerk to United States Supreme Court justice John Marshall Harlan II. In 1961, he began teaching at Harvard Law School.

Legal career
Fried is admitted to the bars of the United States Supreme Court, United States Court of Appeals for the Federal Circuit, the District of Columbia, the Commonwealth of Massachusetts, and numerous U.S. courts of appeals. He argued 25 cases in front of the Supreme Court while in the Solicitor General's office. He has served as counsel to a number of major law firms and clients, and in that capacity argued several major cases, perhaps the most important being Daubert v. Merrell Dow Pharmaceuticals, both in the Supreme Court and in the Ninth Circuit on remand.

Fried's government service includes a year as Special Assistant to the Attorney General of the United States (1984–85) and a consulting relationship to that office (1983), as well as advisory roles with the Department of Transportation (1981–83) and President Ronald Reagan (1982).  In October 1985, Reagan appointed Fried as Solicitor General of the United States. Fried had previously served as Deputy Solicitor General and Acting Solicitor General. As Solicitor General, he represented the Reagan Administration before the Supreme Court in 25 cases. In 1989, when Reagan left office, Fried returned to Harvard Law School.

From September 1995 until June 1999, Fried served as an associate justice of the Supreme Judicial Court of Massachusetts, while teaching constitutional law at Harvard Law School as a Distinguished Lecturer. Prior to joining the court, Fried held the chair of Carter Professor of General Jurisprudence at Harvard Law School. On July 1, 1999, he returned to Harvard Law School as a full-time member of the faculty and Beneficial Professor of Law.  He has served on the Harvard Law School faculty since 1961, teaching courses on appellate advocacy, commercial law, constitutional law, contracts, criminal law, federal courts, labor law, torts, legal philosophy, and medical ethics.

Fried has published extensively. He is the author of nine books and over 30 journal articles. His work has also appeared in over a dozen collections. Unusually for a law professor without a graduate degree in philosophy, he has published significant work in moral and political theory only indirectly related to the law; Right and Wrong, for instance is a general statement of a Kantian position in ethics with affinities with the work of Thomas Nagel, John Rawls, and Robert Nozick. On September 27, 2010, he and Gregory Fried discussed their book Because It Is Wrong: Torture, Privacy, and Presidential Power in the Age of Terror at the American Academy of Arts and Sciences. Fried has been Orgain Lecturer at the University of Texas (1982), Tanner Lecturer on Human Values at Stanford University (1981), and Harris Lecturer on Medical Ethics at the Harvard Medical School (1974–75). He was awarded a Guggenheim Fellowship in 1971–72. Fried is a member of the National Academy of Sciences's Institute of Medicine, the American Academy of Arts and Sciences, and the American Law Institute.

Politics and affiliations
In September 2005, Fried testified before the Senate Judiciary Committee in support of the nomination of John Roberts to become Chief Justice of the United States.  After the nomination of Samuel Alito to the U.S. Supreme Court, Fried praised Alito as an outstanding judge but dismissed claims that Alito is radical, saying, "He is conservative, yes, but he is not radically conservative like Scalia." Fried testified before the Senate Judiciary Committee and wrote a New York Times op-ed in support of Alito, who had served under him in the Solicitor General's office.

On October 24, 2008, despite his previous support for the presidential aspirations of Senator John McCain, Fried announced that he had voted for Senator Barack Obama for President by absentee ballot.  Fried cited McCain's selection of Governor of Alaska Sarah Palin as his running mate as the principal reason for his decision to vote for Obama. As president of the Harvard Law Review in 1990, Obama had published an article Fried wrote criticizing the effects of race-based affirmative action. Fried later told The Wall Street Journal:

I admire Senator McCain and was glad to help in his campaign, and to be listed as doing so; but when I concluded that I must vote for Obama for the reason stated in my letter, I felt it wrong to appear to be recommending to others a vote that I was not prepared to cast myself. So it was more of an erasure than a public affirmation—although obviously my vote meant that I thought that Obama was preferable to McCain-Palin. I do not consider abstention a proper option.

In February 2011, Fried testified before the Senate Judiciary Committee in support of the Patient Protection and Affordable Care Act. When asked by Illinois Senator Richard Durbin to respond to critics of the law's individual mandate who ask: "[I]f the government can require me to buy health insurance, can it require me to have a membership in a gym, or eat vegetables?," Fried replied:

Yes. We hear that quite a lot. It was put by Judge Vinson, and I think it was put by Professor Barnett in terms of eating your vegetables, and for reasons I set out in my testimony, that would be a violation of the 5th and the 14th Amendment, to force you to eat something. But to force you to pay for something? I don't see why not.  It may not be a good idea, but I don't see why it's unconstitutional.

Fried is an adviser to the Harvard chapter of the Federalist Society.

Having supported John Huntsman for the Republican nomination in 2012 and John Kasich for the Republican nomination in 2016, Fried opposed the election of Donald Trump and voted for Hillary Clinton. He endorsed Joe Biden's presidential candidacy in 2020.

While working for the Reagan administration Fried argued that the case Roe v. Wade should be overturned in Webster v. Reproductive Health Services. In an op-ed for The New York Times in 2021, Fried said that Roe should not be overturned, believing that 1992 case Planned Parenthood v. Casey put Roe on firmer constitutional grounds.

Works
 Because It Is Wrong: Torture, Privacy and Presidential Power in the Age of Terror, by Charles Fried and Gregory Fried (2010 W.W. Norton)
 Modern Liberty and the Limits of Government (2006) (Trad. esp.: La libertad moderna y los límites del gobierno, Buenos Aires/Madrid, Katz editores S.A, 2009)
 Saying What the Law Is: The Constitution in the Supreme Court (2004)
 Making Tort Law: What Should Be Done and Who Should Do It (with David Rosenberg) (2003)
 Order and Law: Arguing the Reagan Revolution – A Firsthand Account (1991)
 Contract as Promise: A Theory of Contractual Obligation (2d edition, 2015)
 Right and Wrong (1978)
 Medical Experimentation: Personal Integrity and Social Policy (2d edition, 2016)
 An Anatomy of Values: Problems of Personal and Social Choice (1970)

See also 
 Daubert standard
 List of law clerks of the Supreme Court of the United States (Seat 9)

References

External links
 Solicitor General Biography at U.S. Department of Justice
 Charles Fried faculty page at Harvard Law School
 Video (and audio) of debate/discussion between Charles Fried and Joshua Cohen on Bloggingheads.tv
 Charles Fried and Gregory Fried's discussion of Because It Is Wrong: Torture, Privacy, and Presidential Power in the Age of Terror
 

|-

1935 births
20th-century American lawyers
Alumni of the University of Oxford
American legal scholars
American legal writers
Columbia Law School alumni
Czechoslovak emigrants to the United States
Czech Jews
Federalist Society members
Jewish American writers
Law clerks of the Supreme Court of the United States
Lawrenceville School alumni
Living people
Justices of the Massachusetts Supreme Judicial Court
Harvard Law School faculty
Princeton University alumni
Fellows of the American Academy of Arts and Sciences
Reagan administration personnel
United States Solicitors General
Members of the National Academy of Medicine